Western University may refer to:

United States
Western Illinois University, a public university in Macomb, Illinois, United States
Western Connecticut State University, a public university in Danbury, Connecticut
Western Washington University, a public university located in Bellingham, Washington, United States
Western University (Kansas), a historically black college in Quindaro, Kansas, United States from 1865 to 1943
Western University of Health Sciences, a private graduate-level university in Pomona, California, United States
Western University of Pennsylvania, a former name of the University of Pittsburgh from 1819 to 1908
Western Colorado University, a public university in Gunnison, Colorado

Azerbaijan
Western Caspian University, a private university in Baku, Azerbaijan

Canada
University of Western Ontario, a public university in London, Ontario, Canada

See also
 Midwestern University, Illinois and Arizona